Jack Avon Harbaugh (born June 28, 1939) is a former American football player and coach. He is known for being the longtime head coach at Western Kentucky. He is also the father of the first pair of brothers to serve as head coaches in the National Football League (NFL) and the first pair of head coaching brothers to face off in a Super Bowl: John and Jim Harbaugh.

Early life
Harbaugh was born in Crestline, Ohio, to Marie Evelyn (née Fisher) and William Avon Harbaugh. He is of German and Irish descent. He graduated from Crestline High School in 1957. At Crestline, he was a four-year letterman in both football and baseball. He was an all-state quarterback and shortstop in his senior year. He was also a two-time letterman in basketball.

Playing career
He played college football for the Bowling Green State University Falcons from 1957 to 1960, where he was a three-time letterman. In his junior year, the Falcons finished the season 9–0 and were named the small college division national champions. He was drafted in the 1961 AFL draft by the Buffalo Bills as a running back.

Coaching career
Harbaugh began as an assistant coach to Jerry Nowak at Perrysburg High School in Perrysburg, Ohio, southwest of Toledo. Both sons were born while Harbaugh was in Perrysburg. In 1964, Harbaugh was the head coach of Eaton High School football team in Eaton, Ohio. His record was 5–4–1, their first winning season in many years. In 1965 the team went 6–4. In 1966, Harbaugh was the head coach of the Xenia High School football team in Xenia, Ohio. His record for the one year that he coached was 8–1–1. He received championship honors in the Western Ohio League and was named conference Coach of the Year.

Harbaugh served as an assistant in various college programs from 1968 to 1981.

From 1982 to 1986, he served as the head football coach at Western Michigan University and compiled a 25–27–3 record. From 1989 to 2002, he was the head football coach at Western Kentucky University. During his tenure with the Hilltoppers he posted a 91–68 record, including three 10-win seasons. The Hilltoppers were the only team to rank in the top 10 every year in rushing offense from 1991-2002. In 2002, the WKU squad won the NCAA Division I-AA national football championship.

After leaving Western Kentucky, Harbaugh served as an associate athletic director at Marquette University, Milwaukee, Wisconsin, where his son-in-law, Tom Crean, was the head coach of the men's basketball team. Harbaugh has also served as an assistant coach at Morehead State University, Bowling Green State University, the University of Iowa, the University of Michigan, Stanford University, the University of Pittsburgh, and the University of San Diego.

Harbaugh retired in 2006, but served as Stanford's running backs coach in the 2009 Sun Bowl under his son, Jim. Jack filled in for Willie Taggart, who had recently been hired as the new head football coach at WKU.

Personal life
Harbaugh married his wife, Jacqueline M. "Jackie" Cipiti in 1961. They have three children: John, Jim and Joanie. Jack and Jackie settled in Mequon, Wisconsin, when he took the position as Associate Athletic Director for Marquette University in Milwaukee. Harbaugh is a member of the Bowling Green State University chapter of Phi Delta Theta Fraternity.

Their two sons, Baltimore Ravens head coach John Harbaugh and Michigan Wolverines head coach Jim Harbaugh were the first pair of brothers to serve as head coaches in the National Football League (NFL): The brothers coached their teams in a game unofficially nicknamed the 'Harbaugh Bowl' and 'Har-bowl' on Thanksgiving Day, 2011, one day before Jack and Jackie's 50th wedding anniversary, where John's Ravens beat Jim's 49ers, 16-6. They faced each other again in a second 'Har-bowl' when Baltimore beat San Francisco February 3, 2013 at Super Bowl XLVII in New Orleans by a score of 34–31. Jim also played quarterback at Michigan and for 15 seasons in the NFL for six different teams from 1987 to 2001 before entering coaching.

Their daughter Joani's husband was head basketball coach for the men's Georgia Bulldogs team, Tom Crean. They met while Jack was the head football coach at Western Kentucky University and Crean was an assistant basketball coach to Ralph Willard.

Head coaching record

References

External links
 Stanford profile
 Western Kentucky profile

Living people
1939 births
American football defensive backs
American football quarterbacks
Bowling Green Falcons football coaches
Bowling Green Falcons football players
Iowa Hawkeyes football coaches
Michigan Wolverines football coaches
Morehead State Eagles football coaches
Pittsburgh Panthers football coaches
San Diego Toreros football coaches
Stanford Cardinal football coaches
Western Kentucky Hilltoppers football coaches
Western Michigan Broncos football coaches
High school football coaches in Ohio
Harbaugh family
People from Crestline, Ohio
People from Perrysburg, Ohio
People from Mequon, Wisconsin
Coaches of American football from Ohio
Players of American football from Ohio